Ivan Bošnjak (born 1979) is a Croatian footballer.

Ivan Bošnjak may also refer to:
Ivan Bošnjak (basketball) (born 1982), Serbian basketball player
Ivan Bošnjak (politician) (born 1974), Serbian politician